Gumbo is a spicy, hearty stew or soup.

Gumbo may also refer to:

 Gumbo (surname), a list of people with the name
 Gumbo (mascot), a mascot dog of the New Orleans Saints
 Gumbo, Missouri, a community in the United States
 Gumbo (soil), heavy clay soil
 Okra or gumbo, a flowering plant with edible green fruit
 Gumbo Jones, a character in Gumby
 Gumbo, the family name of the characters in Rose Is Rose
 Gumbo, the code name for Adobe Flex 4

Music
 Gumbo'!, an album by Pink Siifu, 2021
 Gumbo (album), by PJ Morton, 2017
 Gumbo!, an album by Pony Poindexter with Booker Ervin, 1973
 Dr. John's Gumbo, an album by Dr. John, 1972
 "Gumbo" (song), by Phish, 1995
 "Gumbo", a song by Jay Rock from 90059, 2015

See also 
 Captain Gumbo, a Dutch Cajun music and zydeco band
 Vertisol or "black gumbo", a type of soil
 Gumball (disambiguation)